The Bulldogs qualified for the 2021 NCAA National Collegiate Women's Ice Hockey Tournament, ranked as the #5 seed. Defeating the Colgate Raiders in the opening round, the Bulldogs were defeated 3-2 by the #1 ranked Northeastern Huskies in the Frozen Four.

Emma Soderberg captured the WCHA 2020-21 Goaltending Championship. Statistically, she topped all conference goaltenders with both a 1.34 GAA and .951 save percentage. In addition, she tied for the league lead with five shutouts, while ranking second overall in wins with 11.

In the USCHO.com final season rankings, the Bulldogs claimed the number four spot, its highest spot since 2010, when it placed first overall in the rankings.

Offseason

Recruiting

Regular season

Standings

Schedule

|-
!colspan=12 style="  "| Regular Season
|-

|-
!colspan=12 style="  "| NCAA Tournament
|-

|-
!colspan=12 style="  "| WCHA Final Faceoff
|-

Roster

2020–21 Bulldogs

Awards and honors
Ashton Bell, 2020-21 WCHA Defenseman of the Year
Ashton Bell, 2020-21 WCHA First Team All-Star
Emma Soderberg, 2020-21 WCHA Goaltender of the Year
Emma Soderberg, 2020-21 WCHA First Team All-Star
Gabbie Hughes, 2020-21 WCHA Second Team All-Star
Anna Klein, 2020-21 WCHA Second Team All-Star
Anna Klein, All-USCHO.com Third Team

All-America honors
Emma Soderberg, 2020-21 Second Team CCM/AHCA All-American
Ashton Bell, 2020-21 Second Team CCM/AHCA All-American

References

Minnesota Duluth Bulldogs
NCAA women's ice hockey Frozen Four seasons